Christian Jakob Salice-Contessa (1767–1825) was a German poet and writer.

1767 births
1825 deaths
People from Jelenia Góra
People from the Province of Silesia
German poets
German-language writers
German male poets